The Sin Hung-class hydrofoil torpedo boat is a hydrofoil torpedo boat (PTH) in service with the Korean People's Navy.

Construction
The Sin Hung class were being built by at least 1984, and possibly before then. Although it appears possible that a non-hydrofoil Sing Hung-hulled torpedo boat could be transformed into hydrophilic ones, there has been no evidence that the Korean People's Navy have built any of them this way.

Design
The hydrophilic Sin Hung class has larger sponsons than the non-hydrofoil Sin Hung class, in order to accommodate the hydrofoil mechanism.

References

Torpedo boats of North Korea